Eastern Counties 6 was an English level 13 Rugby Union league with teams from Cambridgeshire, Essex, Norfolk and Suffolk taking part.  Promoted teams used to move up to Eastern Counties 5 and, as this was the lowest tier league in the Eastern Counties divisions, there was no relegation.  After just four seasons Eastern Counties 6 was cancelled at the end of the 1991–92 campaign.

Original teams
When the division was created in 1988 it contained the following teams:

Billericay
Brightlingsea
Hadleigh
Old Cooperians
Ongar
Orwell
Thames Sports
Witham

Eastern Counties 6 honours

Number of league titles

Hadleigh (1)
Old Cooperians (1)
Thames Sports (1)
Witham (1)

Notes

See also
London & SE Division RFU
Eastern Counties RU
Essex RFU
English rugby union system
Rugby union in England

References

Defunct rugby union leagues in England
Rugby union in Essex
Rugby union in Cambridgeshire
Rugby union in Norfolk
Rugby union in Suffolk